Otlile "Oti" Mabuse (born 8 August 1990) is a South African talent show judge, presenter, dancer and Latin dance champion currently based in the United Kingdom. She is best known for being a professional dancer on the British television series Strictly Come Dancing, which she won in 2019 and 2020, and its German equivalent, Let's Dance. She was a Dance Captain on The Greatest Dancer. Since 2021, she has been a panellist on The Masked Dancer and became a judge on Dancing on Ice in 2022.

Early life and education
Mabuse was born in Pretoria, and studied civil engineering at university before embarking on a career in professional ballroom dancing. Her elder sister, Motsi Mabuse, is also a professional ballroom dancer. Oti has participated in the German series Let's Dance as a professional dancer, after which she joined Britain's Strictly Come Dancing.

Dancing career

Mabuse won the South African Latin American Championship eight times, after which she moved to Germany to broaden her dancing horizons. She has earned a number of titles in her dancing career; including:
 third place in World Cup Freestyle Latin in 2014,
 second place European Championship Latin in 2014 and
 first place in German Championship PD Freestyle Latin.

Let's Dance
In 2015, Mabuse appeared as a professional dancer on the eighth season of  Let's Dance, the German version of Strictly Come Dancing.

She was partnered with singer Daniel Küblböck. The couple were eliminated in week 9, finishing in sixth place.

In 2016, Mabuse returned as a professional dancer for the ninth season of Let's Dance. She was partnered with television presenter Niels Ruf. The couple were the first to be eliminated in week 2, leaving in 14th place.

Season 8: with celebrity partner Daniel Küblböck

Season 9: with celebrity partner Niels Ruf

Strictly Come Dancing
Highest and lowest scoring performances per dance

In 2015, Mabuse appeared as a professional on the 13th series of Strictly Come Dancing. She was partnered with Olympic boxer Anthony Ogogo. The couple were eliminated in Week 3, finishing in 14th place. That year, she also participated in the Children in Need and Christmas specials of the show, in which she partnered with actors Jack Ashton and Tom Chambers respectively.

In 2016, Mabuse was partnered with former Hollyoaks actor Danny Mac for the show's 14th series. The couple reached the final and finished as runners-up. For the show's 15th series in 2017, she was partnered with Paralympic sprinter Jonnie Peacock, they were eliminated in Week 9 in eighth place. She was paired with England cricketer Graeme Swann for the show's 16th series, they were eliminated in Week 10 in seventh place.

In 2019, for her fifth stint on the show, she was partnered with former Emmerdale actor Kelvin Fletcher, who replaced her originally announced partner, Made in Chelsea star Jamie Laing, who had to withdraw from the show after sustaining a foot injury when dancing on the launch show. They went on to become the winners of the series. Laing was confirmed as a contestant for the 18th series the following year, but was re-partnered with fellow professional Karen Hauer, in which Mabuse was partnered with comedian and actor, Bill Bailey, reaching the final and became series winners, with Mabuse becoming the second pro to win the show twice (the other being Aliona Vilani who won series 9 and series 13) and the only pro to win twice in succession.

On 18 April 2021, two weeks after being unveiled as part of 19th series of the show, Mabuse revealed that this would most likely be her last. On 22 February 2022, Mabuse confirmed she was leaving the show after seven years.

Series 13: with celebrity partner Anthony Ogogo

Series 14: with celebrity partner Danny Mac

Series 15: with celebrity partner Jonnie Peacock

# Bruno Tonioli was absent and there was no guest judge.

Series 16: with celebrity partner Graeme Swann

# Bruno Tonioli was absent; Alfonso Ribeiro was guest judge.

Series 17: with celebrity partner Kelvin Fletcher

Mabuse was originally paired with Jamie Laing, however he had to pull out due to a foot injury whilst the recording of the launch show. Laing was replaced with Kelvin Fletcher, just before the start of the live shows.

# Bruno Tonioli was absent; Alfonso Ribeiro was guest judge.

Series 18: with celebrity partner Bill Bailey

# Motsi Mabuse was absent; Anton du Beke was guest judge.

Series 19: with celebrity partner Ugo Monye

Dance tours and other professional engagements

 2017 - Mabuse took part in the national Strictly Come Dancing - The Live Tour with her celebrity partner Danny Mac. They were voted the winners of more individual shows than any other couple by the audience.
 2017 - In August, Mabuse and Ian Waite announced a 60-date 2018 UK tour An Audience With. She was a contestant on an episode of Tipping Point: Lucky Stars.
 2018 - In October, Mabuse announced she would be teaching at Donahey's Dancing with The Stars Weekends in 2019.
 2019 - Mabuse became a dance captain on The Greatest Dancer, alongside Cheryl, Matthew Morrison and later Todrick Hall.
 2019 - Mabuse was a contestant on Celebrity MasterChef.
 2019 - Mabuse was shortlisted (nominated) for BroadwayWorld UK Awards - Best Choreography of a New Production of a Play or Musical for her work Kiss Me, Kate at the Watermill Theatre.
 2020 - Mabuse became the new host of Boogie Beebies.
 2020 - Mabuse was a contestant on the Christmas Special of Michael McIntyre's The Wheel.
 2021 - On 4 March, it was announced that Mabuse would be a panelist on a brand new ITV show, The Masked Dancer UK, a spin off of The Masked Singer UK, replacing Rita Ora's position in the original show.
 2021 - On 22 December, it was confirmed that Mabuse will replace John Barrowman on the judging panel of the 14th series of Dancing On Ice.
 2022 - In February, Mabuse announced that she was leaving Strictly after seven series.
 2022 - from April, Mabuse worked as the choreographer of the UK and Ireland production of The Cher Show, which will tour the country.

Personal life
In 2014, Mabuse married Romanian dancer Marius Iepure, whom she met in Germany. They currently live in London after moving there from Germany in 2015.

Filmography

Bibliography
 Oti Mabuse, Dance with Oti, Walker Books, London, 27 May 2021. ISBN 9781406399967.
 Oti Mabuse, Dance with Oti: the lion samba, Walker Books, London, 7 July 2022. ISBN 9781529500783.

References

Further reading

External links
Oti Mabuse's Dancing Legends (BBC Radio 4)

1990 births
South African expatriates in England
South African expatriates in Germany
Living people
People from Pretoria
South African ballroom dancers
South African emigrants to Germany
South African emigrants to the United Kingdom
South African female dancers
Strictly Come Dancing winners